Projectnet  is a Finnish database that contains descriptions of both ongoing and completed research projects that are being conducted on natural resources by prominent organizations in Finland.

Project registers are usually maintained by individual organizations, but from Projectnet (in Finnish "Hankehaavi") one can search for project information from five different organizations at the same time. The organizations that produce information for Projectnet are Finnish Food  Authority (Ruokavirasto), the Finnish Geospatial Research Institute (FGI), the National Resources Institute Finland (Luke) as well as the Finnish Environment Institute (SYKE). Four faculties of the University of Helsinki are also involved in the Projectnet: Faculty of Agriculture and Forestry, Faculty of Veterinary Medicine, Faculty of Biological and Environmental Sciences, Faculty of Pharmacy as well as the Viikki Campus Library of the Helsinki University Library.

Project descriptions in the Projectnet are presented in exactly the form that the information producers have written them. These descriptions are linked directly to the information producer's web page that often contains a more extensive project description. Projectnet doesn’t manipulate the produced project descriptions in any way but its directories are created by the basis of the data fields in these descriptions to help the information seekers to find relevant information. All changes in these projects as well as any new projects that have been initiated are stored in the organization's own register, database or web page and these changes are automatically updated to the Projectnet at agreed upon intervals.

The purpose of Projectnet is to improve the discoverability, availability and usability of scientific information within the field of natural resources. Project information is usually found in the publications that come out of different projects. While there are many publication databases in existence, Projectnet is the only extensive, multi-scientific project description database in Finland. As for new scientific projects, Projectnet is the first or even the only available information resource.

In particular, researchers, research sponsors, experts, research administration, decision-makers, organizations and communications professionals need information about different research projects. By using Projectnet it is possible to quickly discover what is being researched within the field of natural resources, who the researchers are and in which organizations they are conducting their research. It can be difficult for the information seeker to determine what would be the best place to find out about climate change or bioenergy, since so many organizations are conducting research in these areas from many different perspectives. This is where Projectnet comes to the information seekers' aid.

Projectnet contains over 10000 project descriptions (2021). The number of descriptions increases as new projects are being initiated. The aim of Projectnet is to get more data producers who are researching natural resources involved in its network.

Background

Projectnet was opened at the end of the year 2010, while the Finnish version Hankehaavi began in January 2008. Projectnet has been produced by the Ministry on Agriculture and Forestry in cooperation with the Viikki Campus Library and the representatives of the research organizations who provide the data. The Projectnet application has been designed and programmed by MI Tietorakenteet Oy (MI Information Structures Ltd).

References

External links

Press release by Ministry of Agriculture and Forestry 17.9.2008 (in Finnish)

Aaltonen, Maj-Lis, Siipilehto, Liisa ja Mattila, Ilkka. Hankehaavi – tutkimushankkeiden hakupalvelu. Maataloustieteen Päivät 2008.
 
Project registers about natural resources in Finland
 Research projects (Geological Survey of Finland)
 Projects (Luke, Natural Resources Institute Finland)
 Projects (Finnish Environment Institute, SYKE)
 Scientific projects (Finnish Food Authority)
 Research projects (Finnish Geospatial Research Institute, FGI)

Natural resource management
Environmental science databases
Science and technology in Finland